This is a list of game titles released for the Commodore 64 personal computer system, sorted alphabetically.

0–9

$100,000 Pyramid
007: Licence to Kill
10 Knockout!
10-Pin Bowling
10th Frame
10000 Meters
180
19 Part One: Boot Camp
1942
1943: One Year After
1943: The Battle of Midway
1985: The Day After
1994: Ten Years After
1st Division Manager
2001
221B Baker Street
3-D Breakout
3-D Labyrinth
3-D Skramble
3D Construction Kit
3D Glooper
3D Tanx
4 Soccer Simulators
4th & Inches
4x4 Off-Road Racing
50 Mission Crush
5th Gear
720°
720° Part 2

A

Aaargh!
Aardvark
ABC Monday Night Football
Abrakadabra
Accolade's Comics
ACE - Air Combat Emulator
Ace 2
ACE 2088
Ace Harrier
Ace of Aces
Acrojet
Action Biker
Action Fighter
Action Force
Adam Norton's Ultimate Soccer 
The Addams Family
Addicta Ball
ADIDAS Championship Football
Adrenalin
Adult Poker
Advance to Boardwalk
Advanced Dungeons & Dragons: Heroes of the Lance
Advanced Basketball Simulator
Advanced Pinball Simulator
Adventure Construction Set
Adventure Master
Adventure Quest
Adventureland
Adventures in Narnia: Dawn Treader
Adventures in Narnia: Narnia
Aegean Voyage
After Burner
After The War
Afterlife
Afterlife II
Afterlife v1.0
Afterlife v2.0
Aftermath
Agent Orange
Agent USA
Agent X
Agent X II: The Mad Prof's Back
Ah Diddums
Aigina's Prophecy
Air Support
Airborne Ranger
Airwolf
Airwolf II
Alcazar: The Forgotten Fortress
ALF: The First Adventure
Alf in the Color Caves
Alice in Videoland
Alice in Wonderland
Alien (graphics adventure)
Alien
Alien 3
Alien Storm
Alien Syndrome
Aliens: The Computer Game
Alter Ego
Alleykat
Altered Beast
Alter Ego: Female Version
Alter Ego: Male Version
Alternate Reality: The City
Alternate Reality: The Dungeon
Alternative World Games
Amadeus Revenge
Amaurote
The Amazing Spider-Man
Amazon Warrior
Amazon
America's Cup
American Tag-Team Wrestling
Amnesia
Anarchy
Andy Capp: The Game
Annals of Rome
Annihilator
Annihilator II
Another World (1990) (Double Density)
Another World (1991) (CP Verlag)
Another World (1992) (X-Ample)
Ant Attack
Antimonopoly
Antiriad
Apache
Apache Gold
Apache Strike
Apocalypse Now
Apollo 18: Mission to the Moon
Apple Cider Spider
Arabian
Arabian Nights
Arac
Arachnophobia
Arcade Classics
Arcade Flight Simulator
Arcade Fruit Machine: Cash 'n' Grab
Arcade Game Construction Kit
Arcade Pilot
Arcade Trivia Quiz
Arcade Volleyball
Arcadia
Arcana
Archipelago
Archon: The Light and the Dark
Archon II: Adept
Archon III: ExciterD
ArciereD
ArcoD
ARCOSD
Arctic ShipwreckD
Arctic Wastes!D
Arc of Yesod
Arcticfox
ArdantD
Ardok the BarbarianD
Ardy the Aardvark
Area 13D
Area EstimationD
AreasD
AreeD
ArenaD
Arena 3000D
Arena Football
ArenumD
ArexD
ArgoD
ArgonD
Argon - L'Orrore di ProvidenceD
The Argon FactorD
ArgosD
The Argos ExpeditionD
Arhena! The AmazonD
Arithme-SketchD
The Arithmetic GameD
ArithmeticianD
ArizonaD
Arizona - The Boy in the BubbleD
The Ark of ExodusD
Ark PandoraD
Arkanoid
Arkanoid: Revenge of Doh
Armageddon
The Armageddon Files
The Armageddon Man
Armalyte
Armalyte - Competition Edition
Armalyte II
Armourdillo
Army Moves
Army Moves II
Arnie
Arnie II
Arnie Armchair's Howzat
Artillery Duel
Artura
Asterix and the Magic Cauldron
The Astonishing Adventures of Mr. Weems and the She Vampires
Astro-Grover
Asylum
The Attack of the Phantom Karate Devils
Ataxx
ATC - Air Traffic Controller
ATF
Athena
Atlantis
Atlantis Lode Runner
Atomic Robo-Kid
Atomino
Atomix
Attack Chopper!
Attack of the Mutant Camels
Attack of the PETSCII Robots
ATV Simulator
Auf Wiedersehen Monty
Auf Wiedersehen Pet
Aufstand der Sioux
Auggie Doggie and Doggie Daddy
Aussie Games
Auto Mania
Autoduel
Avenger
Avenger (Way of the Tiger II)
Avengers
Avoid the Noid
Aztec
Aztec Challenge
Aztec Tomb
Aztec Tomb Revisited

B

B-1 Nuclear Bomber
B-24
B.A.T.
B.C. Bill
B.C.'s Quest for Tires
B.C. II: Grog's Revenge
Baal
Back to the Future
Back to the Future Part II
Back to the Future Part III
Backgammon
Bad Blood
Bad Dudes Vs. Dragon Ninja
Bad Street Brawler
Badballs
Badlands
Bagitman
Ballblazer
Ballistix
Balloonacy
Ballyhoo
Baltic 1985: Corridor to Berlin
Bandits
Bangers and Mash
Bangkok Knights
Barbarian
Barbarian II: The Dungeon of Drax
Barbarian: The Ultimate Warrior
Barbie
The Bard's Tale
The Bard's Tale II: The Destiny Knight
The Bard's Tale III: Thief of Fate
Barry McGuigan World Championship Boxing
Basil the Great Mouse Detective
Basket Master
Batalyx
Batman
Batman: The Caped Crusader
Battle Chess (1989) by Interplay
Battle Chess (1992)
Battle Through Time
Battle Valley
Battles of Napoleon
Battleships
BattleTech: The Crescent Hawk's Inception
Battlezone
Batty
Bay Street
Bazooka Bill
Beach Buggy Simulator
Beach-Head
Beach Head II: The Dictator Strikes Back
Beach Head III
Beach Volley
Beaky and the Egg Snatchers
Beamrider
Bear Bovver
Beat-it
Beatle Quest
Bee 52
Beer Belly Burt's Brew Biz
Below the Root
Benji: Space Rescue
Betrayal
Better Dead Than Alien
Beverly Hills Cop
Beyond Castle Wolfenstein
Beyond Dark Castle
Beyond the Black Hole
Beyond the Forbidden Forest
Beyond the Ice Palace
Big Bird's Special Delivery 1984
Big Deal, The
Big Game Fishing
Biggles
Big Mac
Big Trouble in Little China
Bill & Ted's Excellent Adventure
Bilbo the Hobbit
Bionic Commando by Go!
Bionic Commando (USA Version) by Capcom
Bionic Granny
The Birds and the Bees II: Antics
Black Crystal
Black Gold (1983) by Photronics
Black Gold (1989) by reLINE Software
Black Gold (1992) by Starbyte Software
Black Hawk
Black Lamp
Black Magic
Black Tiger
Blackwyche
The Blade of Blackpool
Blade Runner
Blades of Steel
Blagger
Blagger Construction Set
Blagger goes to Hollywood
Blasteroids
Blinky's Scary School
Blitzkrieg
Blockout
Blood Brothers
Blood Money
Bloodwych
Blue Encounter, The
Blue Max
Blue Max 2001
Blue Moon
Blue Thunder
Blues Brothers, The
BMX Kidz
BMX Simulator
BMX Racers by Mastertronic
BMX Trials
Bobby Bearing
The Boggit
Bomb Jack
Bomb Jack 2
Bombo
Bombuzal
Bonanza Bros.
Bonecruncher
Bonka
Booty
Bop'n Rumble
Bop'n Wrestle
Border Zone
Bored of the Rings
Borrowed Time
Bosconian
Boss
Boulder Dash
Boulder Dash II: Rockford's Revenge
Boulder Dash III
Boulder Dash Construction Kit
Bounces
Bounder
Bounty Bob
Bounty Bob Strikes Back!
Bozo's Night Out
Bram Stoker's Dracula
BraveStarr
Break Dance
Breakout
Breakout Construction Kit
Breakstreet
Breakthrough in the Ardennes
Breakthru
Brian Bloodaxe
Brian Jacks Superstar Challenge
Brian Jack's Uchi Mata
BrickFast
Bride of Frankenstein
Bristles
Broadsides
Bruce Lee
Bubble Bobble
Bubble Dizzy
Bubble Ghost
Buck Rogers: Planet of Zoom
Buck Rogers: Countdown to Doomsday
Budokan - The Martial Spirit
Bugaboo (The Flea)
Bug Bomber
Buggy Boy
Bugs Bunny Private Eye
Bugsy
Bumpin' Buggies
Bump Set Spike
Bundesliga 98/99
Bundesliga Live
Bundesliga Manager
Bundesliga Manager v2.0
Bundesliga Manager v3.0
Bundesliga Manager Polish Version
BurgerTime
Burger Time '97
Burnin' Rubber
Bushido
Buster Bros (also known as Pang)
Butasan
Butcher Hill
By Fair Means or Foul

C

Cabal
California Games
Camelot Warriors
Campaign Manager
Captain America in: The Doom Tube of Dr. Megalomann
Captain Blood
Captain Dynamo
Captain Fizz
Captain Power
The Captive
Capture The Flag
Captured
Card Sharks
Carnage
Carrier Command
Castle Master
Castle Nightmare
Castle of Terror
Castle Wolfenstein
The Castles of Dr. Creep
Castlevania
Catalypse
Catastrophes
Cauldron
Cauldron II: The Pumpkin Strikes Back
Cave Fighter
Cave of the Word Wizard
Cavelon
Cavelon II
Caveman Games
Caveman Ughlympics
Centipede
Challenge of the Gobots
Chambers of Shaolin
Championship 3D Snooker
Champions of Krynn
Championship Baseball
Championship Lode Runner
Championship Lode Runner: Extended Edition
Championship Lode Runner: Training Missions
Championship Sprint
Championship Wrestling
Chase H.Q.
Chernobyl
Cheese Graphics Editor
Chess 7.0
Chess 7.5: How About a Nice Game of Chess!
Chess Analyse
Chess Champion
Chess Grand Master
Chess Quarto
The Chessmaster 2000
Chicago
Chiller
Chimera
China Miner
Chinese Juggler
Chip's Challenge
ChipWits
Cholo
Choplifter
Chubbie Chester
Chubby Gristle
Chuck Norris Superkicks
Chuck Rock
Chuck Yeager's Advanced Flight Trainer
Chuck Yeager's Flight Trainer
Chuckie Egg
Chuckie Egg 2
Circus Charlie
Circus Games
Cisco Heat
Citadel
CJ in the USA
CJ's Elephant Antics
Classic Concentration
Classic Snooker
Clever & Smart
Cliffhanger
Cliffhanger: A Perilous Climb
Cloud Kingdoms
Clowns
Clue Master Detective
Clue!
Cluedo
Clystron
Cobra
Coco Notes
Cohen's Towers
Colonial Conquest
Colony by Mastertronic
Colony (1996) by John Woods
Colony v3
Colors
Colossal Adventure
Colossal Cave Adventure
Colossus Chess 2.0
Colossus Chess 4.0
The Colour of Magic
Combat Course
Combat Crazy by Powerslave Developments and music by Jeroen Tel
Combat School
Comic Bakery
Commando
Commando 86
Commando II
Commando Libya
Compunet
Computer Baseball
The Computer Edition of Risk: The World Conquest Game
Computer Football Strategy
Computer Quarterback
Conan: Hall of Volta
Confuzion
Congo Bongo
Continental Circus
Contra
ConundrumD
Cool Croc Twins
Cool World
Cops 'n' Robbers
CorporationD
Corruption
CorsairD
Cosmic Causeway: Trailblazer II
Cosmic CrusaderD
Cosmic PirateD
Cosmic Relief: Prof. Renegade to the RescueD
Count and Add
Count, The
Count Duckula in No Sax Please - We're EgyptianD
Countdown To MeltdownD
Cover Girl Strip Poker
Crack Down
Crack-Up
Crazy Balloon
Crazy CarD
Crazy CarsD
Crazy Cars 2D
Crazy Cars III
Crazy Comets
Crazy Kong
Crazy Sue
Create with GarfieldD
Creative ContraptionsD
Creatures
Creatures II: Torture Trouble
Crime and Punishment
Crillion
Crisis Mountain
The Crimson Crown
Crossbow
Crossfire
CrossroadsD
Crossroads IID
Crossword CreatorD
Crossword Magic 4.0D
Crossword PuzzleD
Crusade in EuropeD
Crush, Crumble and Chomp!
Crystal Castles
Crystal Kingdom Dizzy
Crystals of Zong
CubulusD
Curse of RaD
The Curse of Sherwood
Curse of the Azure Bonds
Cuthbert Enters the Tombs of Doom
Cuthbert Goes Walkabout
Cuthbert in SpaceD
Cuthbert in the JungleD
Cutthroats
Cyberball
Cyberdyne WarriorD
Cybernoid
Cybernoid II: The Revenge
Cybertron Mission
Cyborg
The Cycles: International Grand Prix Racing

D

Dalek Attack
Daley Thompson's Decathlon
Daley Thompson's Olympic ChallengeD
Daley Thompson's Super-Test
Dallas Quest
The Dam Busters
Dan Dare: Pilot of the Future
Dan Dare II: Mekon's Revenge
Dan Dare III: The Escape
DandyD
Daredevil Dennis
Dark Castle
Dark Fusion
Dark LordD
Dark Side
The Dark TowerD
Darkman
David's Midnight Magic
David's Midnight Magic IID
Days of Thunder
DDTD
Deactivators
Dead EndD
Dead or AliveD
Deadline
Death in the CaribbeanD
Death Bringer
Death Knights of Krynn
Death StarD
Death Wish 3
Deathlord
Decisive Battles of the American Civil War Volume 1: Bull Run to Chancellorsville
Defender
Defender 64D
Defender of the Crown
Deflektor
Déjà Vu by Ariolasoft-Axis KomputerkunstD
Déjà Vu by Mindscape
Deliverance: Stormlord II
The Delphic Oracle
Delta
Delta Man
Demon Attack
Demon Stalkers
Demon's Winter
Depthcharge
Desert Fox
Designasaurus
Destroyer
The Detective
Deus Ex Machina
Dick Tracy
Die Hard
Die Hard 2: Die Harder
Dig Dug
Dinky Doo
Dino Eggs
Diplomacy
Dive Bomber
Dizzy Down the Rapids
Dizzy Panic!
Dizzy Prince of the Yolkfolk
Dizzy: The Ultimate Cartoon Adventure
DNA Warrior
Doctor Doom's Revenge
Doctor Who and the Mines of Terror
Doctor Who and the Entropilytes
Doctor Who 2
Dogfight 2187
Dogfight!
Domination
Dominion
Donald's Alphabet Chase
Donald Duck's Playground
Donkey Kong
Doomdark's Revenge
Dot Gobbler
Double Dare
Double Dragon
Double Dragon II: The Revenge
Double Dragon 3: The Rosetta Stone
Double Dribble
Double Take
Dough Boy
Draconus
Dracula
Drag Race Eliminator
Dragon Breed
Dragon Ninja
Dragon Skulle
Dragon Spirit
Dragon Wars
Dragon's Lair
Dragons Den
Dragon's Lair II: Escape from Singe's Castle
DragonHawk
Dragonriders of Pern
Dragons of Flame
DragonStrike
Dragonworld
Drelbs
Dream House
Driller
Drol
Dropzone
Druid
Druid II: Enlightenment
Duck Shoot
Ducks Ahoy!
DuckTales: The Quest for Gold
Duckula 2: Tremendous Terence
The Duel (1986) by Paradize Software
The Duel: Test Drive II
Dungeon
Dungeon Maker by Ubisoft
Dungeon of Doom
Dunzhin
Duotris
Dynamic Duo
Dynamite Dan
Dynamite Düx
Dynamix (1988) by Digital Design
Dynamix (1989) by Mastertronic
Dynasty Wars

E

E-Motion
Eagle Empire
Earth Orbit Stations
Echelon
Eddie Kidd Jump Challenge
The Eidolon
Elektra Glide
Elevator Action
Elidon
Elite
Elm Street
Elvira: Mistress of the Dark
Elvira: The Arcade Game
Elvira II: The Jaws of Cerberus
Emerald Isle
Emerald Mine
Emlyn Hughes International Soccer
The Empire of Karn
Empire
Empire!
Empire: Wargame of the Century
Enchanter
Encounter
Enduro Racer
Energy Warrior
Enigma Force
Enigma Force Construction Set
Entity
Entombed
Eon
Equations
Equinox
Erebus
Erik the Viking
Escape from the Planet of the Robot Monsters
Espionage
ESWAT: City Under Siege
The Eternal Dagger
Eureka!
European Champions
European Football Champ
Evening Star
Everest Ascent
Everyone's a Wally
The Evil Dead
Evolution (1982 video game)
Excalibur
Exile
Exolon
Exploding Fist II: The Legend Continues
Extended Championship Lode Runner
Exterminator
Eye of Horus

F

F-14 Tomcat
F-15 Strike Eagle
F-16 Combat Pilot
F-18 Hornet
F-19 Stealth Fighter
F1 GP Circuits
F.1 Manager
F1 Tornado
Face Off!
The Faery Tale Adventure
Fahrenheit 451
Fairlight
Falcon Patrol
Falcon Patrol II
Fallen Angel by Emerald Software Ltd
Fantasy World Dizzy
The Farm Game
The Farmer's Daughter
Fast Break
Fast Eddie
Fast Food
Fast Tracks: The Computer Slot Car Construction Kit
Fay - That Math Woman!
Fellowship of the Rings
Felony!
Fernandez Must Die
Feud
Fiendish Freddy's Big Top O'Fun
Fight Night
Fighter Bomber
Fighter Command v1.1
Fighter Pilot
Fighting Warrior
Final Assault
Final Blow
Final Fight
Finders Keepers
Fire Ant
Fire & Forget II: The Death Convoy
Fire King
Fire Power
Fire Zone
Firefly
Firelord
Firequest
Firetrack
First Samurai
Fish!
Fish! v1.07
Fisher-Price: Alpha Build
Fist II: The Legend Continues
Fist+
Flasch Bier
Flasch Bier Konstruktion Kit
Flasch Bier 2
Flash Gordon
Flight Path 737
Flight Simulator II
Flimbo's Quest
Flintstones: Yabba-Dabba-Dooo!
Flintstones, The
Flip & Flop
Floyd of the Jungle
Flunky
Flyerfox
Flying Ace
Flying Shark
Football Manager
Football Manager 2
Football Manager 2 Expansion Kit
Football Manager 3
Football Manager World Cup Edition
Footballer of the Year
Footballer of the Year 2
Forbidden Forest
Forbidden Forest 2: Beyond the Forbidden Forest
Forgotten Worlds
Formula 1 Simulator
Fort Apocalypse
The Fourth Protocol
Foxx Fights Back
Fraction Fever
Frak!
Frank Bruno's Boxing
Frankenstein by CRL
Frankenstein (1992) by Zeppelin Games
Frankenstein Jnr.
Frankie Goes to Hollywood
Frantic Freddie
Freak Factory
Fred
Freddy Hardest
Frenzy
Friday the 13th: The Computer Game
Frog Run
Frogger
Frogger II: ThreeeDeep!
Frogs and Flies
Front Line (video game)
Frostbyte
Fruit Machine Simulator
Fruit Machine Simulator 2
Fun School 2
Fun School 3
Fun School 4
Fun School Specials
Fungus
Future Knight

G

G-Force
G-LOC: Air Battle
G.I. Joe: A Real American Hero
G.U.T.Z.
Galactic Conquest
Galactic Empire
Galaga
Galaxian
Galaxy Force
Gamma Strike
Game Over
Game Over II
The Games: Summer Edition
The Games: Winter Edition
The Games: Winter Edition Practice
Gangbusters
Gaplus
Garfield: Big Fat Hairy Deal
Garfield: Winter's Tail
Garrison
Gary Lineker's Hot Shot!
Gary Lineker's Super Skills
Gary Lineker's Superstar Soccer
Gateway to Apshai
Gateway to the Savage Frontier
Gato
Gauntlet
Gauntlet: The Deeper Dungeons
Gauntlet II
Gauntlet III: The Final Quest
Gazza II
Gazza's Superstar Soccer
GBA Championship Basketball: Two-on-Two
Gee Bee Air Rally
Gem'X
Gemini Wing
Gemstone Healer
Gemstone Warrior
Geos (pixel edit program)
Germany 1985
Gertrude's Secrets
Ghetto Blaster
Ghost Chaser
Ghost Town
Ghost Trap
Ghostbusters
Ghostbusters II
Ghosts 'n Goblins
Ghouls
Ghouls 'n Ghosts
Gilligan's Gold
Give My Regards to Broad Street
Gladiator
Glider Rider
Global Chess
Global Commander
Glutton
Gnome Ranger
Go Go The Ghost
Godzilla
Gold Medal Games
Golden Axe
Goldrunner
The Goonies
Gorf
Gradius
Graeme Souness International Soccer
Graeme Souness Soccer Manager
Graham Gooch's All Star Cricket
Graham Gooch's Test Cricket
Grandmaster Chess
Grand Monster Slam
Grand National
Grand Prix
Grand Prix Circuit
Grand Prix Master
Grand Prix Simulator
Grand Prix Simulator 2
Grand Slam Baseball
Grange Hill
Granny's Garden
Grave Yardage
Gravitron
The Great American Cross-Country Road Race
The Great Escape
The Great Giana Sisters
Great Gurianos
Green Beret (also known as Rush'n Attack)
Gremlins
Gremlins: The Adventure
Gremlins 2: The New Batch
Gribbly's Day Out
Gridder
Gridiron
Gridrunner
The Growing Pains of Adrian Mole
Gruds in Space
Gryzor
Guadalcanal
Guerrilla War
Guild of Thieves, The
Gumshoe
Gunfighters
Gunship
Gunslinger
Gust Buster
Gyroscope
Gyroscope Construction Set
Gyroscope II
Gyruss

H

H.A.T.E.
H.E.R.O.
Habitat
Hacker
Hacker II: The Doomsday Papers
Hades Nebula
Hägar the Horrible
The Halley Project
Halls of Montezuma: A Battle History of the U.S. Marine Corps
Halls of the Things
Hammerfist
Hangman's Hazard
Hard Drivin'
Hard Hat Mack
Hardball!
Hardball! II
Hareraiser
Harrier Attack
Harrier Combat Simulator
Harvey Headbanger
Hat Trick
Hawkeye
Headache
Head Over Heels
Heart of Africa
Heartland
Hell Cat Ace
Hellgate
Helter Skelter
Henrietta's Book of Spells
Henry's House
Herbert on the Slope
Herbert's Dummy Run
Hercules
Hercules Slayer of the Damned
Hero Quest
The Heroes of Karn
Herobotix
Hes Games
High Frequency (video game)
High Noon
High Seas
Highland Games
Highlander
Highway Encounter
Hillsfar
Hitchhiker's Guide to the Galaxy, The
Hobbit, The
Hole In One
Hollywood Hijinx
Hollywood or Bust
Hollywood Squares
The Honeymooners
Hook
Hoppin' Mad
Horace Goes Skiing
Hostages by Infogrames
Hot Pop by Rocky SoftHot RodHot WheelsHotShotHoundedHouse of UsherHoverHover BovverHow to be a Complete BastardHoward the DuckHoward the Duck IIHudson HawkHugoThe HulkHuman Killing MachineHunchbackHunchback: The AdventureHunchback at the OlympicsHunchback II: Quasimodo's RevengeHungry HoraceThe Hunt for Red October (1987)The Hunt for Red October (1990)Hunter PatrolHunter's MoonHustlerHydraHydraxHypaballHyper SportsHyperspace WarriorHysteriaII. Q.I, BallI, Ball 2IcarusIce PalaceIdőrégészIkari IIIIkari WarriorsImhotepImpactImperatorImpossamoleImpossible MissionImpossible Mission IIIn Search of the Most Amazing ThingIncredible Shrinking SphereIndiana Jones and the Last Crusade: The Action GameIndiana Jones and the Temple of DoomIndiana Jones in the Lost KingdomIndoor SportsIndy HeatInfernal RunnerInfidelInfiltratorInfiltrator Part II: The Next DayIngrid's BackInjured EngineInside OutingInspector GadgetInspector Gadget and the Circus of FearInstant MusicThe InstituteInternational Basketball (Commodore 64)International Karate (World Karate Champ)International Karate +International Karate + GoldInternational Soccer (1983 computer game) by CommodoreInternational Soccer (1988 computer game) by CRLInto the Eagle's NestIOIridis AlphaIt's a KnockoutItaly '90 SoccerIvan 'Ironman' Stewart's Super Off RoadJJack AttackJack Nicklaus' Greatest 18 Holes of Major Championship GolfJack the NipperJack the Nipper II: In Coconut CapersJack the RipperJackalJail BreakJail WarJailbreak From Starhold 1James Bond 007James Pond 2Jason of the ArgonautsJawbreakerJawsJeep CommandJetJet Set WillyJet Set Willy 2Jet-Boot JackJet-BoysThe JetsonsJewels of DarknessJigsawJinxterJocky Wilson's Darts ChallengeJoe BladeJoe Blade 2John Elway's QuarterbackJohn Madden FootballJordan vs. Bird: One on OneJourneyJourney to Centre of the EarthJr. Pac-ManJudge Dredd (1986)Judge Dredd (1990)Jumpin' JackJumpmanJumpman JuniorJungle HuntJuno FirstJupiter LanderKKampfgruppeKaneKane 2KangarudyKarate ChampKaratekaKarnovKatakisKawasaki Magical MusicquillKawasaki Rhythm RockerKawasaki SynthesizerKennedy ApproachKenny Dalglish Soccer ManagerKenny Dalglish Soccer MatchKentillaKey QuestThe Keys to MaramonKick Off (1983) by Bubble BusKick Off (1989) by Anco SoftwareKick Off 2Kid GridKikstartKikstart 2Killed Until DeadKillerwattKilling MachineKinetikKing of ChicagoKing's BountyKings of the BeachKlaxKnight GamesKnight Games 2Knight OrcKnight RiderKnight TymeKnightmareKnights of LegendKokotoni WilfKonami's Ping PongKongKong Strikes Back!Koronis RiftKosmic KangaKrakoutKromazoneKung-Fu MasterKwik SnaxLL.A. SWATLabyrinth: The Computer GameLamborghini American ChallengeLancelotLas Vegas Video PokerLaser ChessLaser SquadLast BattleLast DuelThe Last NinjaLast Ninja 2Last Ninja 3Last Ninja RemixThe Last V8Law of the WestLazarianLazy JonesLeaderboardLeather Goddesses of PhobosLed StormLegacy of the AncientsThe Legend of BlacksilverThe Legend of KageThe Legend of SinbadLegend of the Amazon WomenLegend of the Knucker-HoleLegions of DeathLe MansLemmingsLethal WeaponLeviathanThe Light CorridorLight ForceLine of FireLions of the UniverseLittle Computer PeopleLive and Let DieLiverpoolThe Living DaylightsLivingstone, I Presume?LocoLode RunnerLode Runner's RescueLondon BlitzLooney BalloonLoopzLord of the Rings: Game OneLords of ChaosLords of ConquestLords of KarmaThe Lords of MidnightLords of TimeLotus Esprit Turbo ChallengeThe Lost Crown of Queen AnneLucky LukeLunar LeeperLunar OutpostLunar RescueThe Lurking HorrorMM.A.S.K. III - Venom Strikes BackM.C. KidsM.U.L.E.Macadam BumperMad DoctorMad NurseThe Magic CandleMagic CarpetMagic Johnson's BasketballMagicland DizzyMail Order MonstersMain FrameMalak (horror urban myth)Mama LlamaManchester UnitedMancopterMandroidManiac MansionManic MinerMankyMarauderMarble MadnessMario Bros.Mars SagaThe Mask of the SunMaster ChessMaster of MagicMaster of the LampsMasters of the Universe: The Arcade GameMasters of the Universe: The MovieMasters of the Universe: The Super AdventureMatch DayMatch Day IIMatch PointMath BlasterMath BustersMayhem in MonsterlandMaziacsMcDonaldlandMean StreetsMeanstreakMega ApocalypseMenaceMercenary: Escape from TargMercenary: The Second CityMercsMetal GearMetro-CrossMiami ViceMichael Jackson's MoonwalkerMickey's Space AdventureMicroballMicrocosmMicroLeague BaseballMicroLeague WrestlingMicroprose SoccerMidnight ResistanceMiecze Valdgira II: Władca GórMig 29 Soviet FighterMight and Magic Book One: The Secret of the Inner SanctumMight and Magic II: Gates to Another WorldMighty Bomb JackMikieMilk RaceMindfighterMind MirrorMind Prober Jr.MindtrapMiner 2049erMini-PuttMinnesota Fats Pool Challenge (aka "Hustler")Mission A.D.Mission AsteroidMission OmegaModem WarsMoebius: The Orb of Celestial HarmonyMolecule ManMoneybags (1983)Monkey Magic (1984)MonopolyMonster MunchMontezuma's RevengeMonty MoleMonty on the RunMoon CrestaMoon PatrolMoon ShuttleMoondustMoonmistMothershipMorpheusMotor ManiaMotosMountain KingMountain Palace AdventureThe Movie Monster GameMr AngryMr. Do!Mr. Do's CastleMr. HeliMr. MephistoMr. Robot and His Robot FactoryMr. WimpyMs. Pac-ManMulti-Player Soccer ManagerThe MuncherMunchman 64Murder on the MississippiMurder on the ZinderneufMushroom AlleyMusic ComposerMusic Construction SetMusic MachineMutant HerdMutant MontyMythMyth: History in the Making''

D is a link to the Wikidata page for this game. Games that may not be notable enough for Wikipedia can often be found there.

See also
List of Commodore 64 games
List of Commodore 64 games (N–Z)

References

A-M
Commodore 64: A-M

ca:Llista de videojocs de Commodore 64
de:Liste bekannter C64-Spiele
it:Videogiochi per Commodore 64
tr:Commodore 64 Oyunları